Howard Prairie Lake is a reservoir located  above sea level in Jackson County, Oregon, United States.

History
A canal diverting water from nearby Little Butte Creek, (in the Rogue River watershed), to the lake was also completed.

Statistics
The lake has a  drainage basin.

During the 2020–21 North American drought, the lake reached 4% capacity.

Flora and fauna
Howard Prairie Lake is known for its large number of rainbow trout, largemouth bass, and smallmouth bass.
Ducks and geese inhabit the surrounding regions. The lake is surrounded by pine and fir forests in the Cascade Mountains.

Recreation
Boating, water skiing, fishing, and camping at the three public campgrounds are popular activities at the lake.
Hiking and biking are also popular on trails around the lake. The Howard Prairie Lake Resort is located on the northern shore of the lake and features a large marina, boat ramp, restaurant, campground, and convenience store.

See also
 List of lakes in Oregon

References

Official Howard Prairie Resort Website

External links

Reservoirs in Oregon
Lakes of Jackson County, Oregon
Buildings and structures in Jackson County, Oregon
Protected areas of Jackson County, Oregon
Dams in Oregon
United States Bureau of Reclamation dams
Dams completed in 1958
1958 establishments in Oregon